This may mean of the following:

 Madheshi Jana Adhikar Forum, Nepal (Loktantrik)
 Madheshi Jana Adhikar Forum, Nepal (Republican)
 Madheshi Jana Adhikar Forum, Nepal